Ilias Koutsoupias (born 10 May 2001) is a Greek professional footballer who plays as a midfielder for Serie B club Benevento, on loan from Virtus Entella.

Career 
Koutsoupias moved to Italy at the age of 16.

He made his Serie B debut for Virtus Entella on 3 October 2020 in a game against Reggiana. He substituted Marco Crimi in the 86th minute. He made his first start for Entella on 20 October 2020 against Frosinone.

On 1 September 2021, Ternana announced the acquisition of 20-year-old central midfielder Ilias Koutsoupias on long-season loan from Virtus Entella. Although there was a lot of interest from Serie A clubs and the former Bologna midfielder was ready for the big step, it seems that this will take a year longer. On 12 March 2022, he scored his first goal with the club in a 2–0 home win game against Cosenza Calcio.

On 5 July 2022, Koutsoupias moved to Benevento on loan with an obligation to buy.

Personal life 
His father, Georgios Koutsoupias, is a former professional footballer.

References

External links 
 

2001 births
Living people
Footballers from Heraklion
Greek footballers
Association football midfielders
Serie B players
Serie C players
Virtus Entella players
Ternana Calcio players
Benevento Calcio players
Greek expatriate footballers
Greek expatriate sportspeople in Italy
Expatriate footballers in Italy
Greece under-21 international footballers
Greece youth international footballers